Central Terminus, formerly Garden Road, is the lower terminus of the Peak Tram line. It is located on the bottom floor of the St. John's Building on Garden Road, Central, Hong Kong, 33m above sea level, 28m before renovation.

The current station comprises a single track, with platforms on both sides. One platform is used for boarding, the other for exiting the tram. As the Peak Tram is a major Hong Kong tourist attraction, long queues are common in front of the turnstiles at Central Terminus.

History

The Garden Road station for the Peak Tram opened on 30 May 1888. In 1935, a new terminus was built along with the St John's Apartments: a reinforced concrete building, with eight studio flats and a two-bedroom penthouse. In 1964, the apartments were demolished to make way for a modern 14-storey commercial and residential building. This building was in turn replaced by the current 22-storey building.

Under the Peak Tram Upgrade Project, the terminus was temporarily closed on 23 April 2019, with temporary platforms, located 70 metres uphill from the former platforms, opened on 22 July, and again closed on 28 June 2021. The renovated station, with platforms at the then temporary site, was reopened and renamed to "Central Terminus" on 27 August 2022.

Neighbouring landmarks  
 Central Government Offices
 U.S. Consulate General
 St. John's Cathedral
 Hong Kong Park
 Hong Kong Zoological and Botanical Gardens
 St. Joseph's College
 Murray Building
 Bank of China Tower

Feeder transport 
NWFB Route 15C is operated between Central Ferry Piers and Garden Road Peak Tram Terminus with single decker buses. The fare is exactly HK$4.2.

 and  Central station Exit J2 or Admiralty station Exit C

References 

Central, Hong Kong
Peak Tram stations
Railway stations in Hong Kong opened in 1889